Thomas Huschke (born 29 December 1947) is a retired East German cyclist. He competed at the 1972 and 1976 Summer Olympics in the 4000m individual and team pursuit events. He won a silver team medal in 1972 and an individual bronze medal in 1976, where his team also finished in fourth place overall. 

Between 1970 and 1975 he won one gold, three silver and two bronze medals in the same two events at world championships.

As a road racer, he finished third in the Tour of Belgium in 1972, and won one stage of the Peace Race in 1973.

After retiring from competitions he received a degree in economics, and later briefly worked as a marketing expert of the East German Gymnastics and Sports Association. In 1988 he was manager of figure skater Katarina Witt. From 2004 to 2006 he was chairman of the Frankfurter Cycling Club.

His grandfather Adolf and father Gerhard were both competitive cyclists.

References 

1947 births
Living people
East German male cyclists
Olympic cyclists of East Germany
Cyclists at the 1972 Summer Olympics
Cyclists at the 1976 Summer Olympics
Olympic silver medalists for East Germany
Olympic bronze medalists for East Germany
Olympic medalists in cycling
Cyclists from Berlin
Medalists at the 1972 Summer Olympics
Medalists at the 1976 Summer Olympics
People from East Berlin